Marc was a Belgian professional cycling team that existed from 1978 to 1980.

References

Cycling teams based in Belgium
Defunct cycling teams based in Belgium
1978 establishments in Belgium
1980 disestablishments in Belgium
Cycling teams established in 1978
Cycling teams disestablished in 1980